Selective abortion may refer to:
  Sex-selective abortion
 When a genetic test is performed that detects an undesirable trait; see genetics and abortion
 Selective reduction